Nandor Njergeš (Serbian Cyrillic: Нандор Њергеш, Hungarian: Nyerges Nándor; born September 4, 1973) is a retired Serbian football goalkeeper of Hungarian descent.

During his career he played with FK Budućnost Banatski Dvor, renamed in 2005 to FK Banat Zrenjanin.

References

1973 births
Living people
Hungarians in Vojvodina
Serbian footballers
FK Budućnost Banatski Dvor players
FK Banat Zrenjanin players
Serbian SuperLiga players
Association football goalkeepers